Robert Sampson (1925–2006) was an executive with United Airlines and disability rights activist. Other people with that name include:

 Robert Sampson (actor) (1933–2020), American actor
 Robert Sampson (basketball) (born 1992), an American basketball player
 Robert Sampson (politician) (born 1969), an American politician
 Robert J. Sampson (born 1956), an American sociologist

See also 
 Robert Hampson (disambiguation)